Ménessaire is a commune in the Côte-d'Or department in the Bourgogne-Franche-Comté region in central-east France. In 2019, it had a population of 86. Ménessaire is a Côte-d'Or exclave situated between the Nièvre and Saône-et-Loire departments. It comprises the Mont de Gien, the highest point in Côte-d'Or, at 721 metres.

Demographics

See also
Communes of the Côte-d'Or department
Morvan Regional Natural Park

References

Communes of Côte-d'Or
Enclaves and exclaves